The 1914 State of the Union Address was given by Woodrow Wilson, the 28th United States president, on Tuesday, December 8, 1914, to both houses of 63rd United States Congress.  He concluded it with, "To develop our life and our resources; to supply our own people, and the people of the world as their need arises, from the abundant plenty of our fields and our marts of trade to enrich the commerce of our own States and of the world with the products of our mines, our farms, and our factories, with the creations of our thought and the fruits of our character,-this is what will hold our attention and our enthusiasm steadily, now and in the years to come, as we strive to show in our life as a nation what liberty and the inspirations of an emancipated spirit may do for men and for societies, for individuals, for states, and for mankind."

References

State of the Union addresses
Presidency of Woodrow Wilson
Speeches by Woodrow Wilson
63rd United States Congress
State of the Union Address
State of the Union Address
State of the Union Address
State of the Union Address
December 1914 events